Polyommatus stoliczkanus is a butterfly in the family Lycaenidae. It is found from the western Himalayas to Nepal.

Subspecies
Polyommatus stoliczkanus stoliczkanus
Polyommatus stoliczkanus arene (Fawcett, 1904) (Tibet)
Polyommatus stoliczkanus janetae Evans, 1927 (western Himalayas)

References

Butterflies described in 1865
Polyommatus
Butterflies of Asia
Taxa named by Baron Cajetan von Felder
Taxa named by Rudolf Felder